The Alternative Story is an Indian mental health collective which provides counselling services to individuals and organisations based in Bengaluru. It aims to provide mental health services that are affordable, intersectional feminist, trauma-informed, kink-aware, queer-affirmative and caste aware.

History 
The group was founded in 2018 by Paras Sharma and Rashi Vidyasagar. Sharma had produced a podcast, also called The Alternative Story, from 2018. In 2022, The Alternative Story was one of 40 national and international organisations to collaborate with Jindal School of Psychology and Counselling in their degree course to provide work placements.

During the COVID-19 pandemic, counsellors from the group spoke about the increased needs for their services, and the mental health impacts of the lockdowns and other pandemic measures as well as anxiety when measures were lifted. Members of the Alternative Story have spoken about the impact on people in India and the lack of robust mental health infrastructure.

Services 
The organisation provides the following services:
 One-on-one counselling
 Pay What You Want
 Conjoint and family counselling
 Support groups
 Training and workshops
 Webinars
 Online counselling
 Certificate course in trauma centred therapy

References 

2018 establishments in India
Mental health organisations in India
Organisations based in Bangalore
Organizations established in 2018